ASCC Bopp is a Senegalese basketball club based in Dakar. It plays in the Nationale 1, the highest national level. Established in 1969, Bopp has won the national championship four times.

Honours
Nationale 1
Champions (4): 1993, 1999, 2001, 2004
Cup of Senegal
Champions (1): 1995

Notable players
Alkaly Ndour (4 seasons: 2012–16)

Season by season

References

External links
Official Facebook

Basketball teams in Senegal
Basketball teams established in 1969